Glenn Randall (born 3 September 1986) is an American male cross-country skier and mountain runner, twice world champion at the World Long Distance Mountain Running Championships (2010).

References

External links
 

1986 births
Living people
American male long-distance runners
American male mountain runners
American male cross-country skiers
World Long Distance Mountain Running Championships winners
21st-century American people